The 2005 Alpine Skiing World Cup – Men's Downhill season involved 11 events at sites in North America and Europe between November 2004 and March 2005. Austria's Michael Walchhofer won the individual title, while his Austrian team took the team title.

Calendar

Final point standings

In Men's Downhill World Cup 2004/05 all results count.

Note:

In the last race only the best racers were allowed to compete and only the best 15 finishers were awarded with points.

Men's Downhill Team Results

bold indicate highest score - italics indicate race wins

References
 fis-ski.com

External links
 

World Cup
FIS Alpine Ski World Cup men's downhill discipline titles